Desmond McGann (born 21 July 1945) is an Irish long-distance runner. He competed in the marathon at the 1972 Summer Olympics.

References

1945 births
Living people
Athletes (track and field) at the 1972 Summer Olympics
Irish male long-distance runners
Irish male marathon runners
Olympic athletes of Ireland
Place of birth missing (living people)